Elkin Creek is a  long 4th order tributary to the Yadkin River in Surry and Wilkes Counties, North Carolina.  This is the only stream of this name in the United States.

Variant names
According to the Geographic Names Information System, it has also been known historically as:
Big Elkin Creek
Elkin River

Course
Elkin Creek rises about 1 mile east-southeast of Roaring Gap in Wilkes County, North Carolina.  Elkin Creek then flows southeast into Surry County to join the Yadkin River at Elkin.

Watershed
Elkin Creek drains  of area, receives about 49.9 in/year of precipitation, has a wetness index of 348.98, and is about 49% forested.

References

Rivers of North Carolina
Rivers of Surry County, North Carolina
Rivers of Wilkes County, North Carolina